A lighthouse tender is a ship specifically designed to maintain, support, or tend to lighthouses or lightvessels, providing supplies, fuel, mail, and transportation.

In the United States, these ships originally served as part of the Lighthouse Service and now are part of the Coast Guard. The first American tender of the Lighthouse Service was former revenue cutter , which was acquired in 1840. The  was the last active representative of the service, and is now a US National Historic Landmark.

See also
List of lighthouse tenders by country
Navigational aid
Trinity House
Northern Lighthouse Board

References

Further reading
 
 
 United States Coast Guard, Aids to Navigation, (Washington, DC: US Government Printing Office, 1945).

External links
 Great Lakes Lighthouse tenders, Terry Pepper, Seeing the Light.
 U.S. Coast Guard, Fir (WLM 212).

Ship types
Lighthouses